Strange Cargo 2 is the third album by electronic instrumentalist William Orbit. It was released in 1990. The album is the second in a series of similarly titled albums: Strange Cargo, Strange Cargo III, and Strange Cargo Hinterland.

Critical reception

The Chicago Tribune called the album "a mix of light jazz, funk and a smattering of world music to make it all seem somehow exotic."

AllMusic wrote that "though there's a bit more electronics on this record, [Orbit] still seems uncommonly fixated with textural touches like Spanish guitar, and the effect is much more Windham Hill than Warp."

Track listing
"Dark Eyed Kid"
"Atom Dream"
"Ruby Heart"
"El Santo"
"Dia Del Muerto"
"777"
"The Thief and the Serpent"
"The Last Lagoon"
"Millennium"
"Painted Rock"

References

William Orbit albums
1990 albums
I.R.S. Records albums
Albums produced by William Orbit
Sequel albums